The Sun Odyssey 37.1 and Sun Odyssey 37.2 are a series of French sailboats that were designed by Jacques Fauroux as cruisers and first built in 1994. Both boats use the same hull design.

The Sun Odyssey 37.1 and 37.2 are often confused with Fauroux's similarly-named, but later 1998 Sun Odyssey 37 design.

Production
The Sun Odyssey 37.1 was built by Jeanneau in France, from 1994 to 1996, while the Sun Odyssey 37.2 was built from 1996 to 1998. Both are now out of production.

Design
The Sun Odyssey 37.1  and 37.2 are recreational keelboats, built predominantly of fiberglass, with wood trim. They have masthead sloop rigs, raked stems, reverse transoms, a skeg-mounted rudder controlled by a wheel and a fixed fin keel or optional shoal-draft keel. The fin keel model displaces  and carries  of ballast, while the shoal keel version carries  of ballast.

The designs both have sleeping accommodation for six people, with a double "V"-berth in the bow cabin, a "U"-shaped settee and a straight settee on the starboard side of the main cabin and two aft cabins with a double berth in each. The galley is located on the port side, amidships. The galley has a straight configuration and is equipped with a two-burner stove, an ice box and a double sink. A navigation station is located aft, on the starboard side. There are two heads, one in the bow cabin on the starboard and one on the port side, aft cabin.

The Sun Odyssey 37.2 has a PHRF handicap of 138 to 153.

See also
List of sailing boat types

References

External links
Sun Odyssey 37.1 official website
Sun Odyssey 37.2 official website
Sun Odyssey 37.1 video tour
Sun Odyssey 37.2 video tour

Keelboats
1990s sailboat type designs
Sailing yachts
Sailboat type designs by Jacques Fauroux
Sailboat types built by Jeanneau